Ukraine–Vietnam relations refers to bilateral relations between Ukraine and Vietnam. Vietnam recognized Ukraine's independence from the Soviet Union on 27 December 1991. Diplomatic relations between the two countries were established on 23 January 1992. The embassy of Vietnam in Ukraine started its operations in 1993, and the embassy of Ukraine in Vietnam was opened in 1997.

Political and economic relations 

Vietnam has maintained good relations with Ukraine since the latter's declaration of independence from the Soviet Union. This is largely due to the existence of Vietnamese people in Ukraine and the fact that Ukraine is a primary supplier of military equipment to Vietnam. Ukraine has played a significant role in helping Vietnam upgrade and modernize its military.

Vietnam has maintained a neutral stance on the Russo-Ukrainian War since 2014, and the stance remained following the 2022 Russian invasion of Ukraine.

The two countries have sought to expand their trade and economic ties as of 2018. For Vietnam, Ukraine is an important trade partner in Europe, due to long, historical ties between the two nations, dating back to the Soviet era.

High level visits
Minister of Foreign Affairs of Ukraine Pavlo Klimkin visited Vietnam in September 2017. He met with Vietnamese Prime Minister Nguyen Xuan Phuc.

Diaspora

Vietnamese community in Ukraine 
The 2001 Ukrainian census counted 4,000 Vietnamese people. As of 2022, according to the Vietnamese Ministry of Foreign Affairs, there are approximately 7,000 Vietnamese in Ukraine. Ukrainians regard the Vietnamese community positively, based on historical commonality and the legacy of Soviet influence between two. The Vietnamese community also serves as a bridge connecting Vietnamese populations in other Slavic nations such as Poland, Russia, and Czechia, where large Vietnamese diasporas exist.

In 1985, the Soviet Union signed an agreement with Vietnam to allow gifted Vietnamese students to study or work in the country. This led to the formation of Vietnamese communities in the former Soviet Union, the largest of which are in Kharkiv, Odesa, and Kyiv.  Notably, billionaire Phạm Nhật Vượng lived in Kharkiv during the 1990s.

Ukrainian community in Vietnam 
As of 2016, approximately 2,000 Ukrainians in total are estimated to live in Vietnam, including 120 people in the consular register of the Embassy of Ukraine in Vietnam.

In Vietnam there are neither organizations of Ukrainian community, nor religious communities of immigrants from Ukraine, partly due to its large distance and lack of interests.

The vast majority of Ukrainians in Vietnam are labor migrants. They mainly consider their stay in Vietnam as temporary and plan to return home after labor contracts with employers conclude. Ukrainian citizens work in the fields of tourism, trade, maritime transport, coal and petroleum, and a small number of them are engaged in business. A small number of Ukrainians belong to mixed Ukrainian-Vietnamese families.

Ukrainian citizens are most numerous in the cities of Nha Trang (about 100 people), Vung Tau (about 100), Hanoi (about 50), and Ho Chi Minh (50).

See also 
 Foreign relations of Ukraine
 Foreign relations of Vietnam

Further reading 

 Cultural and humanitarian cooperation between Ukraine and Vietnam, Embassy of Ukraine in the Socialist Republic of Vietnam

References 

 
Vietnam
Bilateral relations of Vietnam